James Morris was an English professional footballer who played as a goalkeeper in the Football League for Clapton Orient.

Career statistics

References

Footballers from Greater London
English footballers
Leyton Orient F.C. players
English Football League players
Year of birth missing
Date of death missing
Association football goalkeepers
Brentford F.C. wartime guest players